Örenköy can refer to the following villages in Turkey:

 Örenköy, Balya
 Örenköy, Çamlıdere
 Örenköy, Çerkeş
 Örenköy, Dursunbey
 Örenköy, Emirdağ
 Örenköy, Manyas